Marius Cătălin Tudorică (born 12 November 1993) is a Romanian professional footballer who plays as a midfielder for Metalul Buzău.

References

External links
 
 

1993 births
Living people
Footballers from Bucharest
Romanian footballers
Association football midfielders
Liga I players
Liga II players
Liga III players
FC Voluntari players
FCV Farul Constanța players
ASC Daco-Getica București players